Matías Ezequiel Catalán (born 19 August 1992) is an Argentine-born Chilean football player, who plays for Argentine Primera División club Talleres de Córdoba as a right-back.

Career
Catalán made his senior debut in Copa Argentina for San Lorenzo on May 17, 2012, against River Plate.

In 2016, he joined Atletico Rafaela.

Personal life
Catalán holds dual Argentine-Chilean nationality since his father, Claudio, is Chilean.

Honours
San Lorenzo
Copa Libertadores: 2014

References

External links
 

1992 births
Living people
Sportspeople from Mar del Plata
Argentine footballers
Argentine sportspeople of Chilean descent
Citizens of Chile through descent
Chilean footballers
Association football defenders
San Lorenzo de Almagro footballers
Atlético de Rafaela footballers
San Martín de Tucumán footballers
Atlético San Luis footballers
Estudiantes de La Plata footballers
C.F. Pachuca players
Talleres de Córdoba footballers
Primera Nacional players
Argentine Primera División players
Liga MX players
Ascenso MX players
Argentine expatriate footballers
Chilean expatriate footballers
Argentine expatriate sportspeople in Mexico
Chilean expatriate sportspeople in Mexico
Expatriate footballers in Mexico